(History of the Caliphs) is the title of several works on the history of Islam:

History of the Caliphs, a work written by al-Suyuti (died 1505)